In mathematics, a Jacobian, named for Carl Gustav Jacob Jacobi, may refer to:

Jacobian matrix and determinant
Jacobian elliptic functions
Jacobian variety
Intermediate Jacobian

Mathematical terminology